Rick and Morty – Let the Rick One In is a graphic novel, jointly written by Kyle Starks & Tini Howard and illustrated by Marc Ellerby, and released in two parts throughout 2018 by Oni Press, as the eighth volume of the comic series based on the television series of the same name by Justin Roiland and Dan Harmon. Part One, "Part I", was released on April 25, 2018, while Part Two, "Part II", was released on May 30, 2018. Published with the one-shots A Jerry Bad Day, Rick Air, and Battle Rickale (with backup stories written by Josh Trujillo and illustrated by Rii Abrego), respectively released on March 28, June 27, and July 25 (all 2018), and respectively written by Starks and illustrated by Katy Farina, it is followed by the story arc Rick Revenge Squad. The series' name is a reference to the 2004 Swedish John Ajvide Lindqvist vampire novel Let the Right One In and its 2008 Tomas Alfredson romantic horror film adaptation of the same name.

The main storyline, a direct continuation of the 2015 second season episode "Big Trouble in Little Sanchez" by Alex Rubens, received a universally positive critical reception, comparatively compared to existing vampire novels, described as "pleasingly [reading] like an Adult Swim episode of Rick and Morty".

Overview
Let the Rick One In is set one year after the events of the 2015 second season episode "Big Trouble in Little Sanchez", a "vampire-y two parter" following Coach Feratu's vampire clan as they seek revenge for his murder at the hands of Morty and Summer Smith and Tiny Rick. As Morty becomes a vampire, Summer bonds with the eternal youths of the horde.

The storyline's name is a reference to the novel and film Let the Right One In by John Ajvide Lindqvist.

Plot

Part I
During the events of "Big Trouble in Little Sanchez", Summer Smith kills vampire gym teacher Coach Feratu with a stake through the heart, while her brother Morty and Tiny Rick kill Feratu's followers. One year later, Summer and Morty are kidnapped by different vampires on the way home from a dance, and brought to a Castle of "Draculas" in another country, the coven leader of which seeks revenge for Feratu's murder. Brought to separate rooms to be turned into vampires, Morty quickly decides to go along with it on learning he can have his own brides, while Summer quickly brings the vampires in her room (eternal teenagers, including Feratu's son "Feratu Junior") under her service, who are in awe of her knowledge as a 17-year-old. One week later, Rick and Beth realise Morty is a vampire after raiding his room (previously believing him to have gotten past the house's parental controls), and finding he has been having orgies with six vampire women in there for the entire week (after returning home from the castle). While Rick and Jerry are open to staking Morty, Beth convinces them to try curing him instead, before they raid Morty's room, kill his brides, and inject him with a substance to lead them to where Summer is (on realising she has also been gone for days), with Rick excited at the prospect of killing more vampires in the next issue.

Part II
On making their way to the vampires' castle, using a Morty as a (floating) tracker, Rick, Beth, and Jerry enter the compound, deducing that killing the vampire coven leader will revert Morty to normal, while elsewhere inside, Summer regales her teenage vampire posse of tales of the Sun (the God of the Daytime). As Rick and Jerry take on hundreds of vampires "Jet Li"-style, the coven leader kidnaps Beth and Jerry. As Rick and the coven leader argue about how his "revenge" of turning Morty into a vampire only made him "cool", Summer enters with her posse (with an oblivious Jerry staking Feratu Junior) before having them free Morty, whom Beth sets upon the leader's head, as Summer stakes him through the heart herself. As the posse celebrate with Summer, Jerry ponders when Morty will turn back into a human, while Beth laughs as Rick remarks again on how "cool" Morty is as a vampire.

One-shots

A Jerry Bad Day
Sometime after being fired in "M. Night Shaym-Aliens!", while driving to a copy and print business in order to buy Ivory 32 Pound paper on which to write his résumé, Jerry passes by a billboard reading "Hungry for Pears?". Realising that his former advertising agency repurposed his "Hungry for Apples?" pitch despite firing him for it, goes into a rage at his GPS, inadvertently insulting a passing couple who (mistakenly thinking he is talking about them) pull him out of his car window and beat him up. Stumbling into a nearby alley, Jerry gets his leg caught in a bear trap. After questioning why such a trap would be there, Jerry is rescued by a passerby, Dinah, who brings him to her apartment to remove the trap. At the apartment, Dinah's boyfriend Wintergreen returns home, and the two reveal their plans to rob Jerry and steal his car, beating him up some more before a police officer arrives (to which the couple hide their cocaine brick in Jerry's underwear). After the couple offers him a bribe, the officer orders Jerry perform a striptease for him, before Wintergreen knocks him out and brings Jerry with Dinah and his cousin to Jerry's car, forcing Jerry to serve as their getaway driver while they rob a bank. Leaving the bank, having lost the money and Wintergreen injured, the three are killed when Jerry goes over a bump in the road and sets off their machine gun. After Jerry is pulled over on the side of the street by the same officer from before, the officer prepares to arrest him, before being suddenly mauled and eaten by a grizzly bear (whom the trap was for). Making his way to the copy and print business, a dejected Jerry finds they are sold out of Ivory 32 Pound paper.

The title is a reference to the 2017 comedy-drama film A Very Bad Day by Judy Greer.

Rick Air
In space, Rick and Morty are arrested for transporting psychotropic substances in galactic space, finding themselves in a "Escape from Alcatraz" situation, before learning the ship is transporting the top lieutenants of Party Dog, a galactic crime lord whom Rick is a fan of (based on Spuds MacKenzie). After the lieutenants break out their cuffs, take over the ship, and decide to keep Morty as their hostage, Rick reluctantly sets the ship's controls to drive into the nearest sun, before activating one of Morty's body modifications to call their own ship to retrieve them, killing the lieutenants by exposing them to the vacuum of space before leaving with Laurence (one of the guards). Elsewhere, Party Dog learns of Rick's involvement via security camera footage from Smashbot (one of his lieutenants), swearing revenge on him, and leading into the events of Rick Revenge Squad.

The title is a reference to the 1997 action-thriller film Con Air by Simon West.

Battle Rickale
On an alien planet, Rick and Morty partake in an episode of the "Survial Arena Murder Time", battle royale, in order to win a vacation to the private moon of Gathora, the most exclusive getaway in the known universe, with Rick turning himself into numerous sentient objects (à la Pickle Rick) to gain more of an audience while having Morty handle most of the killing, reluctantly strangling the last constestant, an elephant boy named Ewi, by strangling him, and winning the game. Sometime later, Rick and Morty enjoy Gathora, until Rick vaporises the Imperiator (having entered the game in order to access him), before cutting Morty's vacation short and portalling them home.

The title and plot respectively references and adapts the 1999 dystopian horror novel and 2000 seinen manga series by Koushun Takami, and the 2000 action-thriller film Battle Royale by Kinji Fukasaku.

Backup stories
 In "Rick and Morty in: "Rick Salon"", on the Citadel, alternate versions of Rick and Morty visit a hair salon run by other alternate versions of themselves: Fancy Rick and Bald Morty. On seeing the customer Morty's phone fall out of his pocket, Bald Morty picks it up and goes out back to talk to Fancy Rick's "greater being" experiment Barbra Streisand (Project RM10X76), a tentacle monster grown from Rick and Morty hair, talking to her and showing her pictures he found on the phone. After coming out back and finding Bald Morty with the phone, Fancy Rick feeds him to Barbra, while the customer Rick complains out front about his hair being singed.

 In "Rick and Morty in: "Extra Jerry"", an alternate Jerry gets a job as an extra in a film as "space bourgeoisie", before having his role upgraded to an onscreen part. Months later, Jerry is dismayed to learn only his hand is visible in the released film, while elsewhere, the leader of the New Media group, looking at footage of Jerry hand, demands that they track him down.

 In "A Bunch of Mortys in: "Mortycast"", on the Citadel, Radio Morty reports on the "Mortycast" podcast that his co-host Handsy Morty for "multiple damning allegations", before welcoming his new co-host, '90s Zoo Crew Morty. Reporting on the news of subspace sea arachnids, a listening Morty is captured by one, Radio Morty accidentally plays an old ad from Handsy Morty advertising his "MortyBeds". After concluding to ask his audience to support them on Mortreon, Radio Morty learns that they have been bought out by Raunchy Radio Rick, who shuts them down as Radio Morty laments "the state of independent media".

 In "Jerry's Right", following the events of "Extra Jerry", the alternate Beth considers leaving Jerry, as he is recruited by New Media to serve as a live-in hand model in service of the algorithm, living in a condo with other "streemers" on the understanding that his marriage would end, which Beth refuses on his behalf, wanting the marriage to instead end on her own terms.

 In "Rick and Morty in: "Morty Court"", on the Citadel, following the events of "Rick Salon", the honorable Judge Morty (from the self-titled animatic) presides over an episode of "Morty Court", overseeing the case of "Rick vs. Fancy Rick", with Summer serving as court bailiff. After Rick deduces what Fancy Rick's hair experiments were for, Fancy Rick flees the court via portal to free Project RM10X76, only to be killed by Rick with a pair of giant scissors before he can explain what the creature was actually intended for (only that it involved "this coat"). Rick and Morty then release the creature into the ocean.

Reception

Bubbleblabber described the dialogue of "Part I" as "rather hokey, but as time goes on, the plot gets way more fun and filled with subtle twists that keep you hooked", and "Part II" as "a nice look at where that vampire storyline [in "Big Trouble in Little Sanchez"] could have gone, describing it as "always awesome seeing these characters turn into action stars suddenly [and] also sweet to read some more of Jerry and his dynamic in the family", concluding that the arc's writers to have done "a great job of transferring the outrageous humour of the show into another media. Even the voices sound clear in your head like you’re watching an episode.". The Super Powered Fancast similarly lauded "watching Rick be a bad-ass vampire slayer in this story [and] drawn as being completely capable [in] contrast to how he's normally portrayed", in particular complimenting the "back and forth between Rick and Jerry [as being] written beautifully and flow[ing] really well with the visuals".

Bleeding Cool described the storyline as "a modern day vampire classic", "pleasingly [reading] like an Adult Swim episode of Rick and Morty" and "a plot well made for comedy [which] succeeds in delivering said comedy", with its art "look[ing] and mov[ing] like an episode of the cartoon", in particular complimenting the "additional stylism [a]dded to make the comic feel a little distinct".

Collected editions

References

2018 graphic novels
Rick One In, Let the
Oni Press titles
Prequel comics
Sequel comics
Vampires in comics